Kissing Is No Sin can refer to:
 Kissing Is No Sin (1926 film), German silent comedy
 Kissing Is No Sin (1950 film), Austrian-German comedy